Bilingual Canadian International School (BCIS) is a private international school based in Ho Chi Minh City, Vietnam. The school belongs to The Canadian International School System, along with three other campuses: the Canadian International School Vietnam (CIS), Albert Einstein School (AES) and Canada – Vietnam Kindergarten (CVK).

Established in 2012, BCIS combines the Vietnamese program of the Ministry of Education and Training (MOET) with the English program of the Ontario Ministry of Education (Canada) from elementary school to high school. BCIS is consulted by the Toronto District School Board, the largest school board in Canada. The school launched the International General Certificate of Secondary Education (IGCSE) program in 2021. BCIS also provides the International Primary Curriculum (IPC) and the International Middle Years Curriculum (IMYC).

Its campus in Phu My Hung (District 7) has a total area of 13,000m2, accommodating up to 1,500 students. During its first operating year, BCIS and CIS attracted more than 1,000 students from 30 countries.

References

External links
 
 

International schools in Ho Chi Minh City
Canadian international schools in Vietnam